John Hart House or John L. Hart House may refer to:

John Hart House (Portsmouth, New Hampshire), listed on the NRHP in Rockingham County, New Hampshire
John D. Hart House, Pennington, New Jersey, listed on the NRHP in Mercer County, New Jersey
John L. Hart House (Hartsville, South Carolina), listed on the NRHP in Darlington County, South Carolina
John L. Hart House (Springville, South Carolina), listed on the National Register of Historic Places in Darlington County, South Carolina

See also
Hart House (disambiguation)